Kevin Stuar Riascos Segura (born 21 June 1995) is a Colombian professional footballer who plays as a defender for Charlotte Independence.

Club career

Charlotte Independence
On 19 March 2021, Riascos signed with USL Championship side Charlotte Independence. He made his debut on 1 May 2021, starting against Tampa Bay Rowdies.

References

External links
 

1995 births
Living people
Association football defenders
Colombian footballers
Llaneros F.C. players
Uniautónoma F.C. footballers
Barranquilla F.C. footballers
Jaguares de Córdoba footballers
Patriotas Boyacá footballers
FC Arizona players
FC Golden State Force players
Charlotte Independence players
National Premier Soccer League players
USL League Two players
USL Championship players
Colombian expatriate footballers
Colombian expatriate sportspeople in the United States
Expatriate soccer players in the United States
Footballers from Bogotá